Cowskin Creek is a stream in northwest Douglas and extreme southeastern Webster counties of Missouri. Cowskin has its headwaters in southeast Webster County west of Cedar Gap and is a tributary to Beaver Creek which it joins just west of the Arno store. The stream is bridged by Missouri Route 14 just east of the junction with Missouri Route K.

According to tradition, a pioneer citizen skinned cows who had died of disease near this creek.

See also
List of rivers of Missouri

References

Rivers of Douglas County, Missouri
Rivers of Webster County, Missouri
Rivers of Missouri